Coffeen and Western Railroad  is a subsidiary of Ameren for receiving coal at its power plant south of Coffeen, Illinois. It also owns hopper cars often hauled by Union Pacific.

External links
Rail Car Photos

Illinois railroads